Oksana Yurevna Kondratyeva (born 22 November 1985) is a Russian track and field athlete competing in the hammer throw. Her personal best of  ranks her in the all-time top ten of the event. She represented Russia at the 2013 World Championships in Athletics, placing seventh.

She is a four-time participant at the Summer Universiade, with her best performance coming in 2013, when she won the silver medal. She holds the title of Russia Master of Sport – International Class. She is the daughter of hammer thrower Yuriy Sedykh and sprinter Lyudmila Kondratyeva.

Career

Early life and career
Raised in Moscow, she is the daughter of two Olympic champions: 1976 and 1980 Olympic hammer throw champion Yuriy Sedykh and 100 metres Olympic champion Lyudmila Kondratyeva. Her half-sister Alexia Sedykh is also an international hammer thrower and was the 2010 Summer Youth Olympics champion competing for France. Oksana Kondratyeva became a member of the Moscow Youth Sports Club and began competing in the hammer in her late teens.

In 2004, she placed third in the Russian junior category and was third in the Moscow regional championship. She won the Moscow under-23 competition the following year, clearing sixty metres for the first time, and ranked seventh nationally in the national winter throws and Russian Athletics Championships. She competed sparingly in 2006 while studying, but managed to win the Russian under-23 title. This earned her a spot at the 2007 Summer Universiade in Bangkok, although with a throw of  she was well below par on her international debut.

First senior competitions
Kondratyeva entered the full senior ranks in 2008 and continued to improve, first throwing  for fourth at the Brothers Znamensky Memorial then  as runner-up at the Moscow Championships. She won at the Kuts Memorial, but ranked seventh at the national championships. She gained her second call-up for Russia at the 2009 Summer Universiade and placed thirteenth in the final.

Her upward trend continued into 2010, when she threw over 68 metres several times and placed second at the Russian Winter Championships and third in her group at the 2010 European Cup Winter Throwing. This made her the 14th best hammer thrower globally that year. Despite this, she was below sixty metres and out of the top eight at that year's national championships.

At the start of 2011 she competed on the global circuit for the first time and placed fourth at the Meeting Grand Prix IAAF de Dakar. Her best throw that season came in the final of the Russian Championships, where her mark of  left her again runner-up to Lysenko. Having opted for post-graduate study, she was eligible for the 2011 Summer Universiade and had her best finish at the games by coming sixth overall. She ranked twentieth in the world that year internationally.

2013 World Championships
Kondratyeva, after five years in the senior ranks, finally reached international level performances. This moved her up to sixth place on the all-time women's hammer throw lists. Her fourth consecutive appearance at the Summer Universiade (held on home soil in Kazan) brought her first international medal in the form of a silver behind American Jeneva McCall. A third place at the Russian Championships with a mark of  meant she was chosen to represent Russia at the 2013 World Championships in Athletics in Moscow. She performed well on her first appearance on the global championship stage: her opening throw of  made her the fifth best in qualifying and her best mark in the hammer throw final of  meant she finished seventh in the event (national rival Lysenko won the competition and another Russian, Anna Bulgakova, was fifth).

At the beginning of 2014 she ranked in the top eight at the Golden Grand Prix and World Challenge Beijing meetings.

Doping 
On 7 April 2021, Kondratyeva was banned for four years by the Court of Arbitration for Sport for an anti doping rule violation with all her results from 2 July 2013 onwards disqualified, including her silver medal at the 2013 Universiade and her 7th placed finish at the 2013 world championships.

Personal bests
Hammer throw –  (2013)

International competition record

References

External links

Living people
1985 births
Athletes from Moscow
Russian female hammer throwers
World Athletics Championships athletes for Russia
Universiade silver medalists for Russia
Medalists at the 2013 Summer Universiade
Competitors at the 2011 Summer Universiade
Universiade medalists in athletics (track and field)
Russian Athletics Championships winners